Sampson Gordon Berns (October 23, 1996 – January 10, 2014) was an American activist with progeria, an extremely rare and fatal disease that causes the body to age rapidly. Berns helped raise awareness about the disease  and he was the subject of the HBO documentary Life According to Sam, which was first screened in January 2013.

Progeria Research Foundation
His parents, Scott Berns and Leslie Gordon, both pediatricians, received their son's diagnosis when he was less than two years old. Roughly a year later, they established the Progeria Research Foundation in an effort to increase awareness of the condition, to promote research into the underlying causes of and possible treatments for the disease. Moreover, they offer resources for the support of those with progeria and their families.

Honors

Boston Bruins
On November 9, 2013, at a home game for the Boston Bruins, Berns helped host Progeria Awareness Night, sat with the team as an assistant equipment manager, and dropped the ceremonial first puck for that night's game against the Toronto Maple Leafs. Berns and Zdeno Chára, the Bruins captain, had been strong friends since 2006, when Berns attended a Bruins game and met Chára afterwards. Chára had scored in that game and Berns blurted out "You're the hero!". Chára responded: "No, no, you're my hero, our hero."

On January 14, 2014, the Bruins honored Berns with a moment of silence and a video tribute before the start of the game.

New England Patriots
Berns was to be an honorary captain when the New England Patriots hosted the Indianapolis Colts in a divisional playoff game on January 11, 2014; however, he died on January 10, the evening before the game.

Patriots Chairman and CEO Robert Kraft issued a statement on the news of the passing of Berns. "I loved Sam Berns and am richer for having known him," Kraft said.

TED Talk, Sam Berns 
"My Philosophy for a Happy Life" was recorded in 2013 by Berns at the TEDxMidAtlantic and has been viewed over 50 million times (as of February 2023).

Life According to Sam
Life According to Sam is a 2013 documentary film based on the life of Berns and has been shown at film festivals, including Sundance, and it was broadcast on HBO in October. The Academy of Motion Picture Arts and Sciences said it is among 15 documentaries considered for Oscar nominations.

See also
Hayley Okines — English girl who had progeria and was the subject of television specials both in Europe and in the United States.
Lizzie Velásquez — American motivational speaker with a similar but non-terminal medical condition (Marfanoid–progeroid–lipodystrophy syndrome).

References

External links
Progeria Research Foundation
HBO: Documentaries | Life According to Sam | Home
CNN – "Beloved teen Sam Berns dies at 17 after suffering from rare disease"
My Philosophy for a Happy Life: Sam Berns gives a lecture at TEDxMidAtlantic 2013
Sam Berns, 'remarkable' teen who battled rare rapid aging disease, progeria, dies at age 17

1996 births
2014 deaths
American people with disabilities
People from Foxborough, Massachusetts
People from Providence, Rhode Island
People with progeria
American child activists
Activists from Massachusetts
Activists from Rhode Island